The 1965 Tour de Hongrie was the 21st edition of the Tour de Hongrie cycle race and was held from 6 to 10 July 1965. The race started  and finished in Budapest. The race was won by László Mahó.

General classification

References

1965
Tour de Hongrie
Tour de Hongrie